Piestus is a genus of flat rove beetles in the family Staphylinidae. There are more than 30 described species in Piestus.

Species
These 31 species belong to the genus Piestus:

 Piestus acuminatus
 Piestus angularis Fauvel, 1864
 Piestus aper Sharp, 1876
 Piestus boliviensis
 Piestus buquetii Fauvel, 1864
 Piestus capricornis Laporte de Castelnau, 1835
 Piestus chullachaqui Pérez, Rodríguez & Asenjo, 2017
 Piestus convexus
 Piestus ecuadorensis
 Piestus extimus Sharp, 1887
 Piestus formicinus
 Piestus foveolatus
 Piestus fronticornis (Dalman, 1821)
 Piestus fulvipes Erichson, 1840
 Piestus heterocephalus Fauvel, 1902
 Piestus imperfectus
 Piestus lacordairei Laporte de Castelnau, 1835
 Piestus longicornis (Lacordaire, 1833)
 Piestus longipennis Fauvel, 1864
 Piestus mexicanus Laporte, 1835
 Piestus minutus Erichson, 1840
 Piestus penicillatus (Dalman, 1821)
 Piestus pennicornis Fauvel, 1864
 Piestus pygmaeus Laporte de Castelnau, 1835
 Piestus serrufus
 Piestus similis
 Piestus spinosus (Fabricius, 1801)
 Piestus sulcatus Gravenhorst, 1806
 Piestus surrufus Caron, 2012
 Piestus termitis
 Piestus validus Sharp.These, 1876

References

Further reading

External links

 

Piestinae
Articles created by Qbugbot